Cao Thượng may refer to:

Cao Thượng, Bac Giang, Vietnam
Cao Thượng, Bac Kan, Vietnam